Paramulona baracoa is a moth of the subfamily Arctiinae first described by William Dewitt Field in 1951. It is found on Cuba.

References

Lithosiini
Baracoa
Endemic fauna of Cuba